SV Kirchanschöring is a German association football club from the municipality of Kirchanschöring, Bavaria. The club's greatest success has been promotion to the tier five Bayernliga in 2015.

History
The club was formed in September 1946 and spend the first three decades of its existence in lower amateur football. An early highlight for the club was a friendly against FC Bayern Munich, in front of 7,000 spectators, as a farewell match for Bernd Dürnberger who had come out of SV Kirchanschöring youth department and joined Bayern.

SV Kirchanschöring won promotion to the tier five Bezirksliga Oberbayern-Ost in 1975 and won this league in its first season there. The club played the 1976–77 season in the Landesliga Bayern-Süd but could only finish fifteenth and was promptly relegated again.

Kirchanschöring played in the Bezirksliga or the A-Klasse below for the next 25 years. It was relegated from the Bezirksliga in 1987 and 1991 but returned in 1988 and 1998 and won a second title in the league in 2001–02.

The club played the 2002–03 season in the Bezirksoberliga Oberbayern but was relegated after finishing fourteenth. It returned to the Bezirksoberliga the season after and played at this level for the next seven seasons mostly as a mid-table side. In 2010–11 a runners-up finish allowed the club participation in the promotion round to the Landesliga in which the club secured another promotion.

Its second stint in the Landesliga Bayern-Süd was no more successful than its first with SV Kirchanschöring coming sixteenth in 2011–12, the last season of the league. As the Landesligas were enlarged in numbers from three to five however the club was not relegated but qualified for the new southeast division instead.

The club became a founding member of the Landesliga Bayern-Südost in 2012 and played the next three seasons at this level. After finishing sixth and fifth in its first two season there Kirchanschöring won the league in 2014–15 and earned promotion to the Bayernliga for the first time.

Honours
The club's honours:
 Landesliga Bayern-Südost
 Champions: 2015
 Bezirksliga Oberbayern-Ost
 Champions: 1976, 2002
 Runners-up: 2004

Recent seasons
The recent season-by-season performance of the club:

 With the introduction of the Regionalligas in 1994 and the 3. Liga in 2008 as the new third tier, below the 2. Bundesliga, all leagues below dropped one tier.

References

External links
Official club site 
Official site of the football department 
SV Kirchanschöring at fupa.net 

Football clubs in Germany
Football clubs in Bavaria
Football in Upper Bavaria
Association football clubs established in 1946
1946 establishments in Germany
Traunstein (district)